WRPI (91.5 FM) is a non-commercial free-format college radio station run entirely by students attending Rensselaer Polytechnic Institute and staffed by community members and students. WRPI broadcasts 365 days a year with an effective radiated power of 10,000 watts, serving listeners in Albany, eastern New York, western Massachusetts, Vermont, and via webstream.  The studios are located in the basement of the Darrin Communications Center and the FM signal is broadcast from North Greenbush. Programming includes a wide range of music, cultural and public affairs programs, live bands, special events, and sports simulcasts, particularly of RPI hockey, football, and baseball. WRPI has a large record library dating to the origins of the station, estimated at 43,800 albums, and a large CD library, dating to the start of the medium.

History

Founding
The predecessor to WRPI was an RPI-owned AM broadcasting radio station known as WHAZ. WHAZ began broadcasting in 1922, and was among the first radio stations to broadcast within the United States. First issued to Rensselaer Polytechnic Institute on July 18, 1922, the school extended their license for many years thereafter. This ended with the transfer of the license to WPOW in 1967. While under the ownership of the school, WHAZ found itself under the stewardship of several groups throughout the years. In 1924, the founding of Campus Review, an entertainment broadcasting group, began the focus of the radio station in broadcasting college-centered entertainment and radio for the Troy, New York area. Over two decades later, in the spring of 1947, Carl J. Kunz Jr. founded the "Rensselaer Broadcasting Association", which took charge of managing broadcasting time slots not used by Campus Review. The Association would completely employ the service of students from RPI to run activities. In that same year, the school's radio club began broadcasting their own AM radio station under the call sign W2SZ. The most popular and active station broadcasting on campus at the time, this station was informally referred to by students as WRPI.

Unification
At this point, three different clubs were managing radio broadcasts across the university's campus. Thus the RPI Student Union proceeded to consolidate the clubs into one, the Radio Counsel, by the end of 1948. Only three years later, in 1951, the Radio Counsel was disbanded, and divided into two groups: an amateur radio group, and a broadcast group. The broadcast group still exists under the old banner of W2SZ. As for the broadcast group, WRPI continued to function on AM channels, where it captured the majority of the campus listener audience at the time.

Moving To FM
Without a broadcast tower, or industry grade equipment, WRPI had a meager broadcast range. In many cases, signals could not reach to certain portions of the college campus. In 1956, the station proposed a move to FM broadcasting, in order to take advantage of its high fidelity capabilities. On December 4, 1957, the FCC approved WRPI to begin broadcasting on 91.5 FM, where it continues to broadcast today. This accompanied the construction of a  tower, extending the range of the station to nearly all of Troy, Albany, and Schenectady.

Growth And Evolution
As opposed to contemporary FM radio stations at the time, WRPI found itself as the sole popular music broadcaster in the area. In 1967, the station switched to a progressive rock themed station, abandoning its former free form radio status. In addition, WTEN-TV donated a  radio tower in North Greenbush, New York, which is still used by the station today. This move increased broadcast strength from 750 watts to 10,000 watts. WRPI thus abandoned use of AM signals and extended range to cover large swaths of New York as well as some areas in Vermont and Massachusetts.

The Station Today
During the mid 1970s, as other FM rock and roll radio stations began to form, WRPI made the decision to revert to their former free form radio format. In addition, the station established their studio in the basement of RPI's Darren Communications Center, where it has remained through the decades. The station continues to be completely student run, allowing virtually anyone to receive training, and potentially broadcast on a time slot. In addition to broadcasting on 91.5 FM, the station may also be listened to over the internet.

References

Schedule
History of WRPI

External links
 WRPI official website
 Rensselaer Polytechnic Institute Website

Rensselaer Polytechnic Institute
RPI
RPI
Radio stations established in 1947
1947 establishments in New York (state)